An oblast in Ukraine, sometimes translated as region or province, is the main type of first-level administrative division of the country. Ukraine's territory is divided into 24 oblasts, as well as one autonomous republic and two cities with special status. Ukraine is a unitary state, thus the oblasts do not have much legal scope of competence other than that which is established in the Ukrainian Constitution and by law. Articles 140–146 of Chapter XI of the constitution deal directly with local authorities and their competency.

Oblasts are subdivided into raions, each oblast having from 3 to 10 raions following the July 2020 reform.

General characteristics

In Ukraine, the term oblast denotes a primary administrative division. Under the Russian Empire and into the 1920s, Ukraine was divided between several governorates. The term oblast was introduced in 1932 by Soviet authorities when the Ukrainian SSR was divided into seven oblasts, replacing the previous subdivision system based on okruhas and encompassing 406 raions (districts). The first oblasts were Vinnytsia Oblast, Kyiv Oblast, Odesa Oblast, Kharkiv Oblast, and Dnipropetrovsk Oblast. Soon after that, in the summer of 1932, Donetsk Oblast was formed out of eastern parts of Kharkiv and Dnipropetrovsk oblasts; in the fall of 1932 Chernihiv Oblast was formed on the border of Kyiv and Kharkiv oblasts.

Between 1935 and 1938, there were several newly created and self-governed special border okrugs (okruhas) located along the western border of the Soviet Union in Ukraine and Belarus. Upon liquidation of the okrugs in 1937–1938, Kyiv, Vinnytsia, Odesa, and Kharkiv oblasts were each split into four additional oblasts (Zhytomyr Oblast, Kamianets-Podilsky Oblast (later Khmelnytskyi), Mykolaiv Oblast, Poltava Oblast). Just before World War II, the Donetsk Oblast was split into Stalino Oblast and Voroshylovhrad Oblast and the Kirovohrad Oblast was created out of portions of Kyiv, Mykolaiv and Odesa oblasts.

During World War II, Ukraine added eight more oblasts of the West Ukraine and Bessarabia. Upon the occupation of Ukraine by Nazi Germany the territory was split between General Government, Kingdom of Romania and Reichskommissariat Ukraine and carried out a completely different administrative division, see Reichskommissariat Ukraine. With the re-establishing of Soviet power in the state after the war, the administrative division by oblast resumed, adding one more oblast—Zakarpattia. In 1954, the Crimean Oblast was transferred from the Russian Soviet Federative Socialist Republic to the Ukrainian SSR; parts of the surrounding oblasts were incorporated into the Cherkasy Oblast, while Izmail Oblast was absorbed by Odesa Oblast. In 1959, Drohobych Oblast was merged with Lviv Oblast.

Most of Ukraine's oblasts are named after their respective administrative centers, which are also the largest and most developed cities in the region. Oblast populations range from 904,000 in Chernivtsi Oblast to 4.4 million in the eastern Donetsk Oblast.

Original in 1932
 Dnipropetrovsk Oblast, centered in Dnipropetrovsk (subdivided into raions)
 Kharkiv Oblast, centered in Kharkiv (subdivided into raions)
 Kyiv Oblast, centered in Kyiv (subdivided into raions)
 Odesa Oblast, centered in Odesa (subdivided into raions)
 Vinnytsia Oblast, centered in Vinnytsia (subdivided into raions)
 raions of republican subordination (directly to Kharkiv)

Later there were added
 Donetsk Oblast, centered in Stalino (initially – Artemivsk) (created on 17 July 1932 out of raions of Kharkiv and Dnipropetrovsk oblasts and raions of republican subordination)
 Chernihiv Oblast, centered in Chernihiv (created on 15 October 1932 out of raions of Kharkiv and Kyiv oblasts)

Further division in 1937–1938
 Kamianets-Podilsk Oblast, centered in Kamianets-Podilsk (out of raions of Vinnytsia Oblast)
 Mykolaiv Oblast, centered in Mykolaiv (out of raions of Odesa and Dnipropetrovsk oblasts)
 Poltava Oblast, centered in Poltava (out of raions of Kharkiv and Kyiv oblasts)
 Zhytomyr Oblast, centered in Zhytomyr (out of raions of Vinnytsia and Kyiv oblasts)
 Donetsk Oblast was split into Stalino Oblast, centered in Stalino, and Voroshylovhrad Oblast, centered in Voroshylovhrad

New creations and World War II territorial expansions in 1939–1940
 Kirovohrad Oblast, centered in Kirovohrad (out of raions of Kyiv, Odesa, Poltava and Mykolaiv oblasts)
 Sumy Oblast, centered in Sumy (out of raions of Chernihiv, Poltava and Kharkiv oblasts)
 Zaporizhzhia Oblast, centered in Zaporizhzhia (out of raions of Dnipropetrovsk and Mykolaiv oblasts)
 Drohobych Oblast, centered in Drohobych
 Ivano-Frankivsk Oblast, centered in Ivano-Frankivsk
 Lviv Oblast, centered in Lviv
 Volyn Oblast, centered in Lutsk
 Rivne Oblast, centered in Rivne
 Tarnopol Oblast, centered in Tarnopol
 Chernivtsi Oblast, centered in Chernivtsi
 Izmail Oblast, centered in Izmail

Postwar
 Kherson Oblast, centered in Kherson
 Zakarpattia Oblast, centered in Uzhhorod
 Cherkasy Oblast, centered in Cherkasy
 Crimean Oblast, centered in Simferopol

Maps

Constitutional provisions and authority
The Ukrainian constitution establishes Ukraine as a unitary state. The specific text of the constitution that refers to the territorial structure is as follows.

Each of Ukraine's oblasts has its own legislative and executive authority, most of which is subordinate to the central government authorities in Kyiv. Each region is administered under laws passed by the Ukrainian government and the Constitution of Ukraine. Each region levies its own taxes and, in return, receives a portion of its budget from Kyiv, which gives them a portion of the taxes it levies.

Executive power in each of the oblasts (as well as in other subdivisions of Ukraine) is exercised by local elected administrations. The heads of local administrations are in turn appointed and dismissed by the President of Ukraine upon nomination by the Cabinet of Ministers. Since Ukraine is a unitary state, there is little true political power and weight that these local administrations actually hold. Carrying out their authority, the heads of local administrations are accountable to the President and are subordinate to higher bodies of executive leadership. According to the Constitution the head of the heads of the local Oblast administrations should resign after a new President is elected.

Legislative power in the oblast governments is exercised by their respective oblast councils, which in turn supervise the activities of local administrations. They also have considerable budgets managed by an oblast council made up of people's deputies (representatives) voted into office in regional elections every four years, the last of which took place in 2020.

Nomenclature
The name of each oblast is a relative adjective, formed by adding a feminine suffix to the name of respective center city. E.g. Poltava is a center of Poltavs'ka oblast''' (Poltava Oblast). Most of them are also sometimes referred to in a feminine noun form, following the convention of traditional regional place names, ending with the suffix "-shchyna". E.g. Poltava Oblast is also called Poltavshchyna.

Exceptions to this rule include two oblasts, Volyn and Zakarpattia, which retain the names of their respective historical regions, Volyn (Volhynia) and Zakarpattia'' (Transcarpathia), whose respective capitals are Lutsk and Uzhhorod.

The capital cities of the Dnipropetrovsk Oblast and Kirovohrad Oblast were renamed to Dnipro and Kropyvnytskyi in 2016 as part of a process of replacing Soviet toponyms. As the names of the oblasts are mentioned in the Ukrainian Constitution changing them requires a complicated and lengthy process, thus as of 2017 the two oblasts still formally retain their Soviet names.

List

Former
 Izmail Oblast (initially as Akkerman Oblast) existed in 1940–41 and 1944–54 (under Romanian occupation, later was added to Odesa Oblast)
 Drohobych Oblast existed from 1939–1941 and 1944–1959 (under German occupation, it was merged into Lviv Oblast)
 Crimean Oblast (1954–1991) was transformed into Crimean ASSR

Renamed
 Stalino Oblast was the name of Donetsk Oblast 1938-41 and 1943-61 (created out of the united Donetsk Oblast 1932–38, German occupation 1941–43)
 Akkerman Oblast was the name of Izmail Oblast 1940
 Stanislav Oblast was the name of Ivano-Frankivsk Oblast 1939–41 and 1944–62 (German occupation 1941–44)
 Kamianetsk-Podilska Oblast was the name of Khmelnytskyi Oblast 1937-41 and 1944-54 (German occupation 1941–44, later transfer of administrative center to Khmelnytskyi)
 Voroshylovhrad Oblast was the name of Luhansk Oblast 1938–42, 1943–58 and 1970–90 (German occupation 1942–43)
 Tarnopil Oblast was the name of Ternopil Oblast 1939–41 (renamed soon after World War II)
The Dnipropetrovsk Oblast and Kirovohrad Oblast are pending renaming following the renaming of their capital cities to Dnipro and Kropyvnytskyi.

Government

Governors and legislatures

See also

 Geography of Ukraine
 ISO 3166-2:UA
 List of etymologies of country subdivision names: "Ukraine"
 List of places named after people (Ukraine)
 Ukrainian historical regions

Notes

References

External links

 
 
 
 Handbook on history of the Communist Party and the Soviet Union

 
Subdivisions of Ukraine
Ukraine 1
Regions, Ukraine